Robert Kinloch Massie III (January 5, 1929 – December 2, 2019) was an American journalist and historian.  He devoted much of his career to studying and writing about the House of Romanov, Russia's imperial family from 1613 to 1917. Massie was awarded the 1981 Pulitzer Prize for Biography for Peter the Great: His Life and World. He also received awards for his book Catherine the Great: Portrait of a Woman (2011).

His book Nicholas and Alexandra (1967) was adapted as a British film by the same name that was released in 1971. It starred Laurence Olivier, Michael Jayston, and Janet Suzman.

Early life and education

Massie was born in Versailles, Kentucky, to Robert Massie, Jr., an educator, and Molly, née Kimball, an activist for progressive causes. He was raised there and in Nashville, Tennessee. He earned degrees in American studies from Yale University and as a Rhodes Scholar at Oxford University. While at Oxford, Massie played on the Oxford University Men's Basketball Team. He served in the early 1950s as a nuclear targeting officer in the United States Navy, in the period around the Korean War.

Career

Massie worked as a journalist for Collier's and from 1959 to 1962 for Newsweek before taking a position at the Saturday Evening Post. He also taught at Princeton and Tulane universities.

In 1967, after leaving the Saturday Evening Post to concentrate on his historical writing, Massie published his breakthrough book, Nicholas and Alexandra, an authoritative biography of Tsar Nicholas II (1868–1918, reigned 1894–1917) and Alexandra of Hesse (1872–1918), the last Emperor and Empress of Russia. His interest in the Russian imperial house had been inspired by the birth of his son, Robert Kinloch Massie IV, who was born with hemophilia. This hereditary disease also afflicted Nicholas's only son the Tsarevich Alexei Nikolaevich, heir apparent to the imperial throne. 

His book was adapted for a film with the same title, released in 1971 and starring Laurence Olivier and Janet Suzman. It won Academy Awards for Best Costume Design and Best Art Direction-Set Decoration and was nominated for four others, as well as several Golden Globes and BAFTA Awards. 

Massie and his wife Suzanne chronicled their personal experiences as parents of a hemophiliac child in Journey, published in 1975. They had moved to France, and in the book also discussed differences between the health care systems in the US and France.

In the 1990s, much new information about the Romanovs and Russian governments became accessible following the opening of Russian and Soviet archives after the end of the Cold War and the dissolution of the Soviet Union in 1990. In addition, the remains of the Tsar, his wife, and their children were exhumed from unmarked, hidden forest graves near their execution site. Their identities were confirmed by DNA analysis. Massie conducted additional research based on all this new information and published The Romanovs: The Final Chapter (1995). In 1998 the Romanov family were reinterred after a state funeral in the restored Russian Orthodox cathedral at the Peter and Paul Fortress in St. Petersburg, whose traditional name had been restored. 

Massie continued to write biographical books on the Russian Imperial family. He won the 1981 Pulitzer Prize for Biography for Peter the Great: His Life and World. 

This was the basis of an NBC television network miniseries, Peter the Great (1986), which won three Emmy Awards and starred Maximilian Schell, Laurence Olivier and Vanessa Redgrave. 

In 2011 Massie published Catherine the Great: Portrait of a Woman, about the Tsarina Catherine the Great. It won the 2012 inaugural Andrew Carnegie Medal for Excellence in Nonfiction and the 2012 PEN/Jacqueline Bograd Weld Award for Biography.

He also published two books on the early 20th century: Dreadnought: Britain, Germany, and the Coming of the Great War (1991) is a diplomatic history over four decades on the causes of World War I.  Castles of Steel: Britain, Germany, and the Winning of the Great War at Sea (2003) on the role of the ships in the war.

In other activities, from 1987 to 1991, Massie was President of The Authors Guild, and he served as an ex officio council member. While president, he called on authors to boycott any store that refused to carry Salman Rushdie's The Satanic Verses, which had been threatened by Islamic religious leaders.

Personal life and death 

Massie was married to Suzanne Rohrbach from 1954 to 1990. They divorced after having a son and two daughters. He later married Deborah Karl in 1992; she was his literary agent. They also had a son and two daughters together.  Massie died from complications of Alzheimer's disease on December 2, 2019, at the age of 90.

Awards and honors

 Rhodes Scholarship
 1981 Pulitzer Prize for Biography, Peter the Great: His Life and World
 1983 Golden Plate Award of the American Academy of Achievement
 2012 Andrew Carnegie Medal for Excellence in Nonfiction, Catherine the Great
 2012 PEN/Jacqueline Bograd Weld Award for Biography, Catherine the Great

Bibliography

 Nicholas and Alexandra: An Intimate Account of the Last of the Romanovs and the Fall of Imperial Russia (Atheneum, 1967; Ballantine Books, 2000, Black Dog & Leventhal Publishers, 2005)
 Journey (Knopf, 1975) with Suzanne Massie, 
 Peter the Great: His Life and World (Knopf, 1980, Ballantine Books, 1981, Wings Books, 1991)
 Last Courts of Europe: Royal Family Album, 1860–1914 (Vendome Press, 1981) introductory text; picture research and description by Jeffrey Finestone, Greenwich House/Crown Publishers, 1983)
 Dreadnought: Britain, Germany, and the coming of the Great War (Random House, 1991, Ballantine Books, 1992)
 There's an Old Southern Saying: The Wit and Wisdom of Dan May (Crabby Keys Press, 1993), foreword; compiled by William May Stern, 
 The Romanovs: The Final Chapter (Random House, 1995),  and 
 Castles of Steel: Britain, Germany, and the Winning of the Great War at Sea (Ballantine Books, 2004), J. Cape, 2004)
 Catherine the Great: Portrait of a Woman (Random House, 2011),

References

External links
 

1929 births
2019 deaths
American expatriates in France
American Rhodes Scholars
Historians of Russia
Writers from Nashville, Tennessee
Writers from Kentucky
Pulitzer Prize for Biography or Autobiography winners
People from Versailles, Kentucky
People from Irvington, New York
20th-century American historians
21st-century American historians
21st-century American male writers
Newsweek people
The Saturday Evening Post people
20th-century American male writers
American male non-fiction writers
Deaths from dementia in New York (state)
Deaths from Alzheimer's disease
Yale University alumni